University Medical Center of Southern Nevada (UMCSN) is a non-profit (teaching) government hospital in Las Vegas, Nevada. It is the only government run hospital owned and operated by the Clark County Commission.

Overview
The hospital was founded in 1931 and is affiliated with the UNLV School of Medicine and formerly affiliated with the University of Nevada, Reno School of Medicine. The Clark County Commission also sits as the Board of Hospital Trustees that governs the hospital.

Services
As of 2010, UMC was the 18th largest public hospital in the United States, with a capacity of 564 beds for patients.

Level I trauma center, the only designated Level I trauma center in Nevada. The trauma center provides both adult and pediatric care over portions of four states (Nevada, California, Arizona, Utah).
Burn care facility, the only one in Nevada, the Lions Burn Care Center.
Orthopedic and Spine Institute 
Adult and Pediatric Emergency Department
Physical Therapy
Pulmonary Function Lab
Cardiac Rehab
Infusion Clinic
UMC Online Care
Children's Hospital of Nevada
UMC Healthy Living Institute
UMC Center for Transplantation, top ranked kidney transplant program in the United States 
UMC Quick Cares, several locations located throughout the Las Vegas Valley
UMC Primary Care, providing Primary Care for the community
UMC Wellness Center, the largest HIV clinic in the state of Nevada

History
Previous names included:
Clark County Indigent Hospital (1931)
Clark County General Hospital
Southern Nevada Memorial Hospital
UMC was designated as the first Level I trauma center in 1998

Heliport

A heliport is available for emergency air ambulance service.

Notable individuals treated
 Tupac Shakur, 25, died on September 13, 1996, of complications from gunshot wounds from a drive-by shooting after having been in critical condition for 6 days.
 Chris Giunchigliani's husband, Gary Gray, 69, died on April 9, 2015, of complications from injuries sustained after a car accident caused by Gray himself drifting across the center line and crashing his red Ford pickup truck head-on into a white Jeep on State Route 157 eastbound, just northwest of Las Vegas. He was airlifted to the trauma center and later pronounced dead. The driver of the white Jeep was in stable condition. Gray and Giunchigliani were married on June 20, 1987.
 Kenny Guinn, 73, Governor of Nevada (1999–2007), died on July 22, 2010, of complications from injuries sustained after falling from a roof of his Las Vegas home and possibly following from a heart attack.
 Roy Horn, 64, of Siegfried & Roy was stabilized here after he was attacked by one of his own tigers on October 3, 2003. He was transferred to UCLA Medical Center in Los Angeles, California for recovery and rehabilitation.
 Butch Laswell, 37, a professional motorcycle stunt rider, died on March 10, 1996, after succumbing to injuries he sustained during a dangerous motorcycle stunt that went wrong. The stunt was filmed and witnessed live in front of a crowd of spectators. He died en route to the hospital in a Flight for Life helicopter.
 Donald Schieve, 82, died on May 2, 2015, of complications from injuries sustained after severe burns caused by a travel trailer that caught on fire and was owned and operated by Schieve himself in Bullhead City, Arizona. He was airlifted to the burn care facility and later pronounced dead after having been in critical condition for 4 days. Schieve was a former employee of Washoe Health Systems (now Renown Health) at Washoe Medical Center (now Renown Regional Medical Center) and the father of former KOLO-TV morning anchor and reporter Amanda Sanchez (née Schieve) and Reno mayor Hillary Schieve.
 Dan Wheldon, 33, was airlifted to the trauma center after a 15-car pile-up crash at the Las Vegas Motor Speedway during the final race of the 2011 IZOD IndyCar season on October 16, 2011. He was pronounced dead from blunt force trauma to his head at 1:54 pm. of complications from injuries sustained after a race accident.
 UMC treated 104 of the injured people following the 2017 Las Vegas shooting.

References

External links

 

1931 establishments in Nevada
Government agencies established in 1931
Government buildings completed in 1931
Government of Clark County, Nevada
Hospital buildings completed in 1931
Hospitals established in 1931
Hospitals in Las Vegas
Teaching hospitals in Nevada
Trauma centers